Pedro Ricardo Marques Pereira Monteiro (born 3 May 1978), known as Pedrinha, is a Portuguese former professional footballer who played as a central midfielder.

He amassed Primeira Liga totals of 184 matches and 11 goals over eight seasons, all with Paços de Ferreira.

Club career
Born in Oliveira de Azeméis, Porto metropolitan area, Pedrinha grew up in the ranks of F.C. Penafiel and made his debut as a senior in the Segunda Liga, switching in 2001 to F.C. Paços de Ferreira and making his first Primeira Liga appearance on 12 August of that year, against C.F. Os Belenenses. He was an instant first choice for his new club, enduring relegation at the end of the 2003–04 season and being promoted immediately after.

On 22 April 2009, Pedrinha scored twice – both from penalty kicks – in a 3–2 win at C.D. Nacional in the second leg of the semi-finals of the Taça de Portugal (5–4 aggregate victory). During his career at Paços and two seasons at Penafiel he partnered, in central midfield, Paulo Sousa.

On 26 January 2010, Bulgarian side PSFC Chernomorets Burgas signed Pedrinha to a two-year deal worth €180,000. "I hope he will lead the team into the heavy battles in the second half of the season", club manager Krassimir Balakov said upon his arrival. He made his début two days later, in a 3–0 friendly win against PFC Nesebar.

Pedrinha was released by Chernomorets in December 2010, after Balakov resigned as head coach. In late June of the following year, the 33-year-old returned to his first professional club Penafiel, also in the second tier; after retiring, he became manager of the latter's reserves.

References

External links

1978 births
Living people
People from Oliveira de Azeméis
Sportspeople from Aveiro District
Portuguese footballers
Association football midfielders
Primeira Liga players
Liga Portugal 2 players
F.C. Penafiel players
F.C. Paços de Ferreira players
First Professional Football League (Bulgaria) players
PFC Chernomorets Burgas players
Portugal youth international footballers
Portuguese expatriate footballers
Expatriate footballers in Bulgaria
Portuguese expatriate sportspeople in Bulgaria